Thirunedunkulam Nedungalanathar Temple is a Tamil temple located at Thirunedunkulam  in the Trichy district of Tamil Nadu, India.  The historical name of the place is Thirunedungalam.  The presiding deity is Shiva, who is locally called Thirunedungalanathar. He is also known as Nithya Sundareswarar.  His consort is known as Oppila Nayaki and Mangalanayaki.

Significance 
It is one of the shrines of the 275 Paadal Petra Sthalams, a group of Shiva Sthalams glorified in the early medieval Tevaram poems by Tamil Saivite Nayanar Tirugnanasambandar. The temple is counted as one of the temples built on the banks of River Kaveri.

Literary mention 
Thirugnanasambandar describes the features of the deity as: 

Thirugnanasambandar has sung 10 hymns on the deity, which are found in Tevaram.

References

External links 
 
 

Shiva temples in Tiruchirappalli district
Padal Petra Stalam